Nejla Ateş (March 7, 1932 - died in Istanbul on September 19, 1995) was a Turkish belly dancer and actress, born in Constanța, Romania. Born as Naciye Batır, she achieved fame under the stage name Nejla Ateş in Turkey and as Nejla Ates in the United States. She was also known as Turkish Delight. Notably, she appeared in the films King Richard and the Crusaders and Son of Sinbad and Fanny, a Broadway musical.

A naked statue of her was erected in Central Park in November 1954.

Ates had a number of scandal sheet-moments, including a running feud with Burlesque queen Rose la Rose, who claimed Ates stole her best belly dancing moves from Rose's act.

Ates, despite her success and beauty, fell into poverty and twice attempted suicide. Her first suicide attempt via an overdose of tranquilizers and aspirin followed an argument with her then lover, singer  Bobby Colt. Ates was named as correspondent in his divorce by Colt's wife Hope Diamond. Ates spoke publicly about her depression thus: "I'm fed up with life... with love... with everything."

Her second suicide attempt with an overdose of barbiturates left her in a temporary coma.

She also suffered a series of injuries, including a slipped disc, apparently related to her dancing. Scandal sheets reported that after she left America to return to Turkey, the once delicate 4'11' tall 98 lb brunette dancer had become a 200 lb blonde. She died in an Istanbul hospital on September 19, 1995.

References

Further reading
 Baysaling, Özer Ates dansi (by her widower) (Turkish)

1932 births
Romanian people of Crimean Tatar descent
Romanian people of Turkish descent
1995 deaths
Romanian emigrants to Turkey
Belly dancers
People from Constanța
Turkish people of Crimean Tatar descent